Ten Wanted Men is a 1955 American Western film directed by Bruce Humberstone and starring Randolph Scott.

Plot
Adam Stewart, a lawyer heading west with grown son Howie, is persuaded by brother John to settle down near him in Ocatilla, Arizona, where he has a ranch and romantic interest in a widow, Corinne Michaels.

The menacing degenerate rancher Wick Campbell has an attractive servant girl, Maria Segura, and also lusts for her, but she wants nothing to do with him. Her interest in Howie strikes a jealous chord in Campbell, who hires gunfighters led by Frank Scavo to rid the region of the meddlesome (in his opinion) Stewarts once and for all.

Campbell's thugs kill a rancher and stampede cattle. One picks a fight with Howie, who surprisingly beats him to the draw in self-defense, only to be locked up by Sheriff Gibbons, falsely accused of murder. Howie busts out and flees with Maria.

Adam Stewart is killed in cold blood by Campbell, for which Howie blames himself while promising to get even. Scavo turns on Campbell, takes his gun, makes him give him the money from his safe, and says that he is now running things. Campbell goes to Maria to persuade her to come with him but is confronted by John, who has been hiding at Maria's house with a wounded Howie and is killed in a gunfight.

John rides to town to take on Scavo's men and prevails. The city has law and order, while the Stewarts celebrate a double wedding with John marrying Corrine and Howie marrying Maria.

Cast
Randolph Scott as John Stewart
Jocelyn Brando as Corinne Michaels
Richard Boone as Wick Campbell
Alfonso Bedoya as Hermando
Donna Martell as Maria Segura
Skip Homeier as Howie Stewart
Clem Bevans as Tod Grinnel
Leo Gordon as Frank Scavo
Minor Watson as Jason Carr
Lester Matthews as Adam Stewart
Tom Powers as Henry Green
Dennis Weaver as Sheriff Clyde Gibbons
Lee Van Cleef as Al Drucker
Kathleen Crowley as Marva Gibbons
Boyd 'Red' Morgan as Red Dawes
Denver Pyle as Dave Weed

References

External links

1955 films
American Western (genre) films
Columbia Pictures films
1955 Western (genre) films
Films directed by H. Bruce Humberstone
Films scored by Paul Sawtell
1950s English-language films
1950s American films